Stephen Graham Ford Mills (born , in Cirencester, Gloucestershire) is a former England international rugby union player. A hooker, he played his club rugby for Gloucester.
 
Mills was educated at Cirencester Grammar School and Gloucestershire Technical College. His first rugby club was Cirencester RFC. He moved to Gloucester in 1975. He represented Gloucestershire, The South and South West and the Barbarians. He captained England 'B' in 1980 and won five full caps for England.

Notes

1951 births
Living people
Barbarian F.C. players
England international rugby union players
English rugby union players
Gloucester Rugby players
Gloucestershire County RFU players
Rugby union players from Cirencester
Rugby union hookers